The three teams in this group played against each other on a home-and-away basis. The group winner Argentina qualified for the sixth FIFA World Cup held in Sweden.

Table

Matches

References

External links
FIFA official page
RSSSF - 1958 World Cup Qualification
Allworldcup

2
Qual
1957 in Chilean sport
1957 in Bolivian sport
1957 in Argentine football